Betsy Brantley is an American actress. She has appeared in numerous films, plays, and television shows since the early 1980s. Her breakout role was in the 1982 film Five Days One Summer with Sean Connery.

Early years 
Betsy Brantley was born in New York City to Jack R. Brantley, a textile executive, and Dotty Brantley (née Rabey). In 1960, Jack moved the family to Greensboro, North Carolina, moving into the same house on Meadowbrook Terrace where he grew up. In 1962 Jack moved the family to Rutherfordton, North Carolina to serve as division president at dress-manufacturer Tanner. Betsy has a fraternal twin Alison, an older brother Jack Jr., and a younger brother Duncan who is a producer and screenwriter.

Growing up Brantley spent a great deal of her time in the Blue Ridge mountains near Rutherfordton, where she developed a love for mountains. Her affinity with mountains helped her land her first major role in the film Five Days One Summer.

Brantley graduated from the University of North Carolina at Chapel Hill in 1977 and the Central School of Speech and Drama in the United Kingdom in 1980.

Career 
Brantley's first major role was Kate in the 1982 film Five Days One Summer with Sean Connery. The film's director, Fred Zinnemann, cast Brantley because he wanted a new, unfamiliar face. Zinnemann only auditioned young women with little or no acting experience because he didn't want audiences associating a known actress, who had been around the block a time or two on screen or in a publicized personal life, spoiling the illusion of virtue. Until her role in Five Days One Summer, her acting experience had been limited to a few roles in the English theater, a five-minute part in a British TV movie and a minor role in the film Shock Treatment.

Like Five Days One Summer, many of Brantley's films are based in Europe. Her most famous role, perhaps, is her portrayal of Neely Pritt in Shock Treatment (1981).  She also played alongside Pierce Brosnan and Michael Caine in the film version of The Fourth Protocol (1987) and acted a cameo in the Ashley Judd movie Double Jeopardy (1999). Brantley was also the performance model for Jessica Rabbit in Who Framed Roger Rabbit (1988).

Along with roles in several other films, including Havana (1990) and Deep Impact (1998), Betsy has been a cast member in a number of television shows, including Tour of Duty and Second Noah.  On Tour of Duty, she played the role of Dr. Jennifer Seymour (later Major Jennifer Seymour).  On Second Noah, she played Jesse Beckett, a veterinarian and the mother of eight adopted children.

Brantley played Dolph Lundgren's girlfriend in Dark Angel (1990, retitled I Come in Peace in America).

She has also appeared as Elsie Cubitt in the Granada Television production of "The Dancing Men", from The Adventures of Sherlock Holmes by Sir Arthur Conan Doyle, and also appeared in the 1987 BBC Horizon film, Life Story (the story of the discovery of the DNA double helix) as James Watson's sister, Elizabeth Watson.

Personal life 
Brantley married actor Simon Dutton, and later the filmmaker Steven Soderbergh. She has one daughter, Sarah, with Soderbergh. Sarah lives in Seattle, Washington.

Brantley is a private person and somewhat uncomfortable with the stardom she achieved. After her critical success with Five Days One Summer, she said "I'd like to have had my career move a little slower, I find the attention just a bit daunting."

Brantley lives in a pre-Civil War era home in the Montford, Virginia area with her pet cat Blueberry.

Filmography

Film

Television

References

External links

Living people
People from Rutherfordton, North Carolina
Alumni of the Royal Central School of Speech and Drama
American film actresses
American television actresses
Actresses from North Carolina
20th-century American actresses
21st-century American women
Year of birth missing (living people)